Free state, Free State, or the Free State may refer to:

Places
 Free State (province), a province of South Africa (1994–present)
 Orange Free State, a former Boer Republic (1854–1902)
 Orange Free State (province), a former province of South Africa (1910–1994) 
 Free state (polity), a term used in the official titles of some states, including a list of "free states"
 Free state (United States), a U.S. state in which slavery was illegal before the American Civil War
 Maryland, a U.S. state nicknamed the Free State (in the context of Prohibition)
 Kansas, a U.S state nicknamed the Free State (in the context of slavery)
 Free State of Galveston, a 20th-century whimsical name for Galveston, Texas, U.S.
 Irish Free State (1922–1937), the predecessor of the modern Republic of Ireland

Other uses
 Free State (cricket team), representing Free State, South Africa
 Free State Brewing Company, a microbrewery based in Kansas, U.S.
 Free State Project, an American libertarian political movement 
 Freestate Raceway, a former horse racing track in Maryland, U.S. 
 Free State Review, an American literary journal 
 Lawrence Free State High School, a high school in Lawrence, Kansas, U.S.
 University of the Free State, Bloemfontein, South Africa

See also

 Free city (disambiguation)
 Free Stater (disambiguation)
 Freedom State, 2006 film
 Bound state, in quantum physics
 California Free State, 1996 role-playing game supplement for Shadowrun
 In a Free State, a 1971 novel by V.S. Naipaul